The Karamogo were the scholar class among the peaceful Dyula traders of Western Africa, of which Al-Hajj Salim Suwari was a prominent member. The Karamogo developed theological rationales for living among non-Muslims, arguing that one should nurture one's own faith and let conversion happen in its own time. Accordingly, jihad should not be waged except in defensive contexts.

Ethnic groups in Ghana
Ethnic groups in Guinea
Ethnic groups in Mali
Ethnic groups in Senegal
Islamic philosophical schools